Federico Britto Figueroa (La Victoria, 2 November 1921 - Caracas, 28 April 2000) was a Venezuelan Marxist historian and anthropologist. Brito's ideas and writings played an important role in the ideological formation of Hugo Chavez, former president of Venezuela.

Born in La Victoria in Venezuela, Brito was a member of Venezuela's National Democratic Party (Partido Democrático Nacional — PDN, which later renamed Acción Democrática) in 1936. Britto, after profound schisms appeared in the Venezuelan left, joined the Venezuelan Communist Party (Partido Comunista de Venezuela — PCV), together with Domingo Maza Zavala and Luis Miquilena.

In 1946, Britto entered the Instituto Pedagógico Nacional (National Teaching Institute) to obtain the title of professor of social sciences. Britto later travelled to México. There, he studied in the Escuela Nacional de Antropología e Historia (National School of Anthropology and History). Along with Wenceslao Roces and François Chavalier, Brito graduated with a degree in ethnology and anthropology. Britto returned to Venezuela in 1959, after Marcos Pérez Jiménez's toppling, and began studies at the Universidad Central de Venezuela and was licensed as a historian and obtained his doctorate in anthropology. Britto's doctoral thesis was the renowned and influential work La estructura económica de Venezuela colonial (The Economic Structure of Colonial Venezuela), which he wrote in 1963 and published in 1978.

Key points of his works included the elucidation of slavery, the study of Venezuelan "Federal War" general Ezequiel Zamora, and a critical and probing analysis of the socioeconomic underpinnings of both colonialism and neocolonialism..

Works 
 Ezequiel Zamora. Un capitulo de la historia nacional, Caracas, 1951
 Liberacion de los esclavos, Caracas, 1951
 Venezuela, siglo XX, 1967
 La estructura económica de Venezuela colonial, Caracas, 1978
 Tiempo de Ezequiel Zamora, Caracas, 1981
 El problema tierra y esclavos en la historia de Venezuela, Caracas, 1982
 Historia económica y social de Venezuela: Una estructura para su estudio, Caracas, 1979/1987

References 
 Federico Brito Figueroa (1922–2000), Tomás Straba, semanario Otra Opinión, 1 September 2000, pg. 28. Digital version available at: base de datos at the Biblioteca Nacional de Venezuela.

1921 births
2000 deaths
People from Aragua
Marxist historians
20th-century Venezuelan historians
Venezuelan male writers
Central University of Venezuela alumni
Democratic Action (Venezuela) politicians
Communist Party of Venezuela politicians